Karishma is a feminine given name of Persian origin meaning "miracle" and may refer to:

People 
 Karisma Kapoor, Indian actress 
 Karishma Karki, Nepali Olympian swimmer 
 Karishma Kotak, British-Indian actress 
 Karishma Manandhar, Nepali actress
 Karishma Modi, Indian model 
 Karishma Patel, Indian cast member, Survivor (USA)
 Karishma Randhawa, Indian actress
 Karishma Sharma, Indian actress 
 Karishma Tanna, Indian actress

Other uses 
 Karishmaa, a 1984 Bollywood film
 Karishma – The Miracles of Destiny, a 2003-2004 Indian TV serial